On the Outside may refer to:
 On the Outside (Starsailor album)
 On the Outside (The Marked Men album)
 On the Outside, a 1998 album by Symposium
 "On the Outside", a song by Oingo Boingo from the album Only a Lad
 "On the Outside", a song by No Use for a Name from the album Making Friends
 "On the Outside", a 1996 song by Sheryl Crow from the X-Files album  Songs In The Key Of X